Igel is a municipality in the Trier-Saarburg district, in Rhineland-Palatinate, Germany. Igel is known for the Igel Column, a 23 m high Roman decorated tomb. The Igel Column is a UNESCO World Heritage Site.

References

Trier-Saarburg